Correo Uruguayo (officially Administración Nacional de Correos) is the national postal service in Uruguay.

See also
Postage stamps and postal history of Uruguay
Universal Postal Union
Postal Union of the Americas, Spain and Portugal

External links

Official website.

Uruguay